was a town located in Kaho District, Fukuoka Prefecture, Japan.

As of 2003, the town had an estimated population of 9,965 and a density of 114.09 persons per km². The total area was 87.34 km².

On March 27, 2006, Kaho, along with the city of Yamada, and the towns of Inatsuki and Usui (all from Kaho District), was merged to create the city of Kama.

External links
 Kama official website 

Dissolved municipalities of Fukuoka Prefecture
Populated places disestablished in 2006
2006 disestablishments in Japan